The WAC women's basketball tournament is the conference championship tournament in basketball for the Western Athletic Conference (WAC). The WAC has held a postseason tournament to crown a women's basketball champion every year since 1991. At first the regular season champion hosted it but at its height, the tournament was held at larger urban venues. With the departure of the Mountain West Conference teams, the tournament had returned to campus, with each game in the tournament being held in one campus venue, each year. Since 2011, the tournament has been held at the Orleans Arena, part of the Orleans Hotel and Casino in Las Vegas.

The winner of the WAC tournament is normally guaranteed a berth into the NCAA Division I women's basketball tournament every year. An exception to this was in 2021, when California Baptist won the WAC tournament but was ineligible for the NCAA tournament because the school was in the midst of its transition from NCAA Division II to Division I.

Starting with the 2023 tournament, the WAC adopted a new seeding system based on advanced team metrics, developed in large part by statistical guru Ken Pomeroy. Tournament entry will still be based on conference record.

Results

Records

Note: 2021 champion California Baptist began a transition from NCAA Division II in 2018 and thus was not eligible for NCAA-sponsored postseason play until the 2022–23 season.
 Schools highlighted in pink are former WAC members as of the current 2022–23 WAC season.
 Records for Texas–Rio Grande Valley include those of Texas–Pan American. UTRGV was formally founded in 2013 and began operation in 2015 via the merger of UTPA and UT Brownsville. The UTPA athletic program and its history were transferred to UTRGV.
 Among current WAC members, four have competed in at least one WAC tournament but have yet to reach the title game: Abilene Christian, Sam Houston, UT Arlington, and Utah Valley. Of these schools, only Utah Valley has competed in more than one WAC tournament. The 2021–22 season was the first for Abilene Christian and Sam Houston. UT Arlington competed in the 2013 tournament in the only season of its first WAC tenure; it rejoined for the 2022–23 season.
 Two other members, Tarleton and Utah Tech (renamed from Dixie State before the 2022–23 season), have yet to compete in a WAC tournament. Both schools started transitions from NCAA Division II to Division I in 2020. Under then-current WAC rules, transitional schools were ineligible to compete in the WAC tournament until their third transitional season. (This was changed in advance of the 2022–23 season to allow transitional schools to compete in the tournament upon joining the WAC.) Both schools are ineligible for NCAA-sponsored postseason play until 2024–25.
 Southern Utah is playing its first WAC season in 2022–23.
 New Mexico State and Sam Houston will leave the WAC after the 2022–23 season for Conference USA.

See also 
WAC men's basketball tournament

References